{{DISPLAYTITLE:C15H14O6}}
The molecular formula C15H14O6 (molar mass: 290.26 g/mol, exact mass: 290.079038 u) may refer to:

 Catechin, a flavanol
 Citrinolactone A
 Leucofisetinidin, a leucoanthocyanidin
 Leucopelargonidin, a leucoanthocyanidin
 Luteoforol, a flavan-4ol
 Mesquitol, a flavanol
 Robinetinidol, a flavanol

Molecular formulas